BP Biofuels Highlands was a subsidiary of BP developing cellulosic ethanol project in Florida. It was formerly known as Vercipia Biofuels.  The company headquartered out of Tampa, Florida.

Vercipia was established as a joint venture between BP and Verenium Corporation in 2009.  In July 2010, it became a wholly owned subsidiary of BP. 

Highlands planned to develop a fully integrated commercial plant of cellulosic ethanol located in Highlands County, Florida. The project was cancelled in October 2012.

References

Highlands
Highlands
Highlands
Companies based in Tampa, Florida